Lorain is a city in Lorain County, Ohio, United States. It is located in Northeast Ohio on Lake Erie at the mouth of the Black River, about  miles west of Cleveland. As of the 2020 census, the city had a population of 65,211, making it Ohio's ninth-largest city, the third-largest in Greater Cleveland, and the largest in Lorain County by population.

History 

According to local government records, the city began as an unincorporated village established before 1834 as “Black River Village”, and was renamed in 1837 as "Charleston." According to 19th-century historians, the new name was rejected by its own citizens, who continued to use Black River Village. The village was incorporated as Lorain in 1874 and became a city in 1896. The first mayor was Conrad Reid, who took office on April 6, 1874. The municipal boundaries incorporated most of the former Black River Township judicial boundaries, and portions of the Sheffield Township, Amherst Township, and Brownhelm Township judicial borders.

1924 tornado 
The 1924 Lorain–Sandusky tornado hit the city on Saturday, June 28, 1924. The tornado formed over the Sandusky Bay during the late afternoon hours and hit Sandusky, where it killed eight people and destroyed 100 homes and 25 businesses. After moving east over Lake Erie for several miles, the tornado then struck Lorain, killing 72. Among the dead were 15 people inside a collapsed theater, which makes it the worst tornado-related death toll from a single building in Ohio. Eight people were also killed inside the Bath House near the location where the tornado came onshore.

Geography

Demographics

As of the 2020 United States census, Lorain had a population of 65,211. Of which, 49.4% were non-hispanic White, 29.2% were Hispanic/Latino, 15.2% non-hispanic Black, 0.4% Asian, 0.2% Native American or Pacific Islander, and 5.6% mixed or other.

As of the census of 2010, there were 64,097 people, 25,529 households, and 16,368 families living in the city. The racial makeup of the city was 67.9% White, 17.6% African American, 0.5% Native American, 0.4% Asian, 8.3% from other races, and 5.4% from two or more races. Hispanic or Latino of any race were 25.2% of the population, over 19% is made up of Puerto Ricans.

There were 25,529 households, of which 33.7% had children under the age of 18 living with them, 37.1% were married couples living together, 21.0% had a female householder with no husband present, 6.1% had a male householder with no wife present, and 35.9% were non-families. 30.8% of all households were made up of individuals, and 11.5% had someone living alone who was 65 years of age or older. The average household size was 2.48 and the average family size was 3.09.

The median age in the city was 36.8 years. 26.7% of residents were under the age of 18; 8.8% were between the ages of 18 and 24; 24.6% were from 25 to 44; 26% were from 45 to 64; and 13.9% were 65 years of age or older. The gender makeup of the city was 47.5% male and 52.5% female.

Economy 
Lorain is notable for its deindustrialized economy, formerly being home to the American Ship Building Company Lorain Yard, Ford Motor Company Lorain Assembly Plant, and United States Steel Corporation's steel mill on the city's south side. The city faces many similar issues to other Rust Belt cities, including population decline and urban decay. Poverty in the city is above the national average at 26.2%, lower than Cleveland's 36%. but higher than neighboring Elyria's 22.2%

CenturyTel of Ohio is based in Lorain.

Top employers 
According to the city's 2013 Comprehensive Annual Financial Report, the top employers in the city are:

Arts and culture
The Lorain International Festival is an annual summer festival featuring a pageant.

The Lorain Palace Theatre opened in 1928 and continues operating.

Parks and recreation
There are 51 parks managed by the city parks and recreation department, a total of 583 acres.

Lakeview Park
Lakeview Park is bisected by West Erie Avenue, with the northern section being managed by the Lorain County Metro Parks and the southern by the city. The park was established in 1917 under Mayor Leonard M. Moore as a way of providing more publicly-accessible space on the lakefront.

The park features a beach, rose garden, various recreational facilities, bathhouse, concession stand, several gazebos and picnic shelters, and lawn bowling.

There is a sculpture shaped as an Easter basket built in 1935 with local Amherst sandstone, and dedicated on April 3, 1941, as the "floral basket". Traditionally, families in Lorain, in celebration of Easter, take an annual photo at the basket.

The rose garden was dedicated in 1932, and has 2,500 roses in 48 beds. The shape of the garden, a wheel with eight spokes, is the Rotary International emblem in honor of the 17 community organizations that funded the garden initially, including the Lorain Rotary. The garden was restored in 2005 and roses are planted to honor and commemorate those that had ties to the community or garden itself in city history.

Government

The Lorain municipal government is a Mayor-Council structure, and operates as a statutory city under the laws and regulations set by the Ohio Constitution, making it one of the largest Ohio cities to operate without a charter. The City of Lorain operates on a ward-based system. Elected positions include the mayor, eleven City Council members, the Council President, Auditor, Treasurer, Law Director, Clerk of Courts, and two judges.

The mayor functions as the chief of the executive branch, with job duties including: determining city laws, spurring economic development, planning and administering city projects, delivering city services, negotiating city contracts, and budgeting. As of January 1, 2020, Jack Bradley is mayor.

The City Council consists of 11 members; eight members are elected by ward and three members are elected at-large, with one council member presiding as the President of Council. The Lorain City Council responsibilities include: determining the salary of city officials and employees, enacting ordinances and resolutions of city services, enacts tax levies, appropriating and borrowing money, licensing, regulating business, commerce, and other municipal duties. Council members serve two-year terms. Through the City Budget, the City Council directly controls the operation of the planning, zoning, street construction, maintenance and repair, water and sewer services, municipal court services, and general administrative services.

Politics 
Politics in the city have traditionally been closely tied to the local Democratic Party.

On the State level, Lorain is represented by State Senator Nathan Manning (R-North Ridgeville) of Ohio Senate District 13 and by State Representative Joe Miller (D-Amherst) of Ohio House District 56.

On the Federal level, most of Lorain is represented in the United States House of Representatives by Democratic U.S. Representative Marcy Kaptur . Lorain is represented in the United States Senate by Democratic U.S. Senator Sherrod Brown and Republican U.S. Senator J. D. Vance.

Voter turnout for the 2016 presidential election in Lorain was 24,198 out of a registered 40,885 voters, a voter turnout rate of 59.19%. Democratic candidate Hillary Clinton captured 15,192 votes, or 62.78%; Republican candidate Donald Trump captured 7,584 votes, or 31.34%; Independent candidate Gary Johnson captured 613 votes, or 2.53%; Green candidate Jill Stein captured 222 votes, or 0.92%. Other candidates had marginal amounts of write-in votes; additionally, it is possible that some voters did not select a presidential candidate when casting their ballot.

Education
Lorain City School District operates ten elementary schools, three middle schools, and Lorain High School.

Lorain has a public library, a branch of the Lorain Public Library.

Infrastructure

Transportation 
Lorain primarily has a local street network with four state highways maintained by the Ohio Department of Transportation and one U.S. route. There are no interstate highways that pass through the city limits. Public transit is provided by Lorain County Transit, which operates two fixed-route bus lines. Norfolk Southern Railway operates a freight railroad running parallel to the Lake Erie shoreline.

Public transit 
Lorain County Transit operates two fixed-route bus lines in Lorain: Route 1 and Route 2. Route 1 is a 34-stop bus route connecting Meridian Plaza in downtown Lorain to the LifeSkills Center in Elyria, operating one bus in each direction every two hours. Similarly, Route 2 operates every two hours and serves 36 stops, connecting the same points as Route 1.

Highways 
 U.S. Route 6 runs east–west along Erie Avenue, crossing the northern section of the City along the Lake Erie shoreline. U.S.-6 enters the city in the east from Sheffield Lake and continues west to Vermilion.
 Ohio State Route 2 briefly runs east–west through city limits at the Broadway Avenue/Middle Ridge Road Diamond interchange (exit 166).
 Ohio State Route 57 generally runs north–south, starting in the north at the intersection of Erie Avenue and Broadway Avenue. SR-57 runs south along Broadway until 28th Street, where the route then turns east and crosses South Lorain along the southern border of the steel mill. SR-57 turns south on Grove Avenue and continues south toward Elyria.
 Ohio State Route 58 runs north–south, starting in the north at the intersection of Erie Avenue and North Leavitt Road and continuing south toward Amherst.
 Ohio State Route 611 runs east–west, starting in the west at the partial interchange of Erie Avenue and West 21st Street and continuing east until Colorado Avenue, where it turns east and continues toward Sheffield Village.

Bridges 
There are three bridges that cross the Black River in the Lorain Harbor; two of these bridges are for motor vehicles and pedestrians and one is for rail transport only. The two motor vehicle/pedestrian bridges are the Charles Berry Bridge and the Lofton Henderson Memorial Bridge.These two bridges, formerly known as the Erie Avenue Bridge and 21st Street Bridge, respectively, opened on October 12, 1940. At the time of opening, they were coined the "Twin Bridges."

The Charles Berry Bridge is a double-leaf  bascule bridge; of the total length,  are the bascule span. At the time of construction, the bridge was the largest bascule bridge in the world and is now often credited as the second-largest in the world. Annually, the Charles Berry Bridge has an average of 700 openings.

The rail bridge, historically known as the 11th Street Bridge, is a single-track vertical-lift truss bridge operated by the Norfolk-Southern Railway and constructed in 1974.

Police
The Lorain Police Department was established in 1853 and has 113 police officers and 34 civilian employees.

Notable people

Terry Anderson, journalist and former Lebanese hostage
Dimitra Arliss, actress
Don Barden, Detroit businessman, Lorain's first black city councilman
"Jungle" Jim Bonaminio, founder and owner of Jungle Jim's International Market
Charles J. Berry, Corporal, recipient of the Medal of Honor during World War II
Rashod Berry, Professional Football Player
Sherrod Brown, United States Senator from Ohio since 2007
Martha Chase, geneticist, died in Lorain in 2003
Michael Dirda, Pulitzer Prize–winning book critic
Stevan Dohanos, artist
Ruth Anna Fisher, historian and teacher
Ralph Flanagan, big band leader, pianist, composer, and arranger
Gerald Freedman, theatre director, librettist, and lyricist, and a college dean
Robert Galambos, researcher who discovered how bats use echolocation
Eddy Gragus, 1996 US professional cycling champion
Diane Grob Schmidt, 2015 president of the American Chemical Society
Quincy Gillmore, general
Ellen Hanley, singer
William Hanley, author
Raymont Harris, NFL running back
Lofton R. Henderson, US Marine Corps major, a hero of the Battle of Midway
Anthony Hitchens, college and NFL linebacker
JoBea Way Holt, planetary scientist
Ross Kananga, stuntman and actor
Ernest J. King, Chief of Naval Operations and Fleet Admiral of the U.S. Atlantic Fleet in World War II
Mary Lawrence, film and television actress
Ray Lawrence, bandleader, record company executive, record producer and personal manager
Samuel Little, serial killer
Marie McMillin, aviator, world record parachutist and member of Women's Army Corps
Sam McPheeters, singer of Born Against
Jason Molina, singer-songwriter
Toni Morrison, Nobel Prize laureate author
Chad Muska, professional skateboarder
Don Novello, aka Father Guido Sarducci, comedian featured on Saturday Night Live
Robert F. Overmyer, colonel in the United States Marine Corps, test pilot and astronaut
Martha Piper, former chancellor and president of the University of British Columbia
Helen Steiner Rice, author and poet
Pam Robinson, co-founder of the American Copy Editors Society
Paige Summers, pornographic actress & model
Ward Van Orman, three-time winner of the Gordon Bennett Race
Vince Villanucci, NFL player
Bruce Weigl, prize-winning poet
Matt Wilhelm, Former football player and broadcaster - NCAA National Champion (Ohio State Buckeyes), Super Bowl champion (Green Bay Packers)
Johnnie E. Wilson, US Army four-star general

Gallery

In popular culture
Lorain is the setting for Lorain-born Toni Morrison's first novel, The Bluest Eye, where she writes:In that young and growing Ohio town whose side streets, even, were paved with concrete, which sat on the edge of a calm blue lake, which boasted an affinity with Oberlin, the underground railroad station, just thirteen miles away, this melting pot on the lip of America facing the cold but receptive Canada—What could go wrong?

See also
Lorain National Bank

References

External links

City of Lorain

 
Cities in Ohio
Cities in Lorain County, Ohio
Ohio populated places on Lake Erie
Puerto Rican culture in Ohio
Cleveland metropolitan area
1807 establishments in Ohio